Santa Fe station may refer to:

 Santa Fe Station, a hotel and casino in Las Vegas, Nevada
 Santa Fe (Belgrano) railway station, a former station located in Santa Fe, Argentina (1928–1993)
 Santa Fe (Mitre) railway station, a former station located in Santa Fe, Argentina (1891–2007)
 Santa Fe railway station (Mexico City), a proposed commuter station

See also 
 Santa Fe Depot (disambiguation)
 Santa Fe (disambiguation)